J55 may refer to:
 Flader J55, a tubojet engine
 , a minesweeper of the Royal Indian Navy
 Infiniti QX50 (J55), a Japanese SUV
 Parabiaugmented hexagonal prism